Heaters is an unincorporated community in Braxton County, West Virginia, United States. Heaters is situated approximately three miles north of Flatwoods on U.S. Route 19, which is a paved two-lane road.  Access from I-79 is at exit 67 in Flatwoods, or exit 79 at Burnsville,  then Route 5 to Heaters.  There is no stoplight in Heaters.  Heaters has a United States Postal Service post office and the ZIP Code is 26627.  

Prior to the construction of  I-79 in 1974, US-19 was the main road between Morgantown and Charleston, and Heaters was a convenient place to stop. At its peak, Heaters had a gas station, a general store, and a lunch restaurant.  All are now gone.  Heaters does have a community center located at 4350 Gauley Turnpike, which is used for community gatherings such as potluck dinners, memorial service dinners, and fundraising dinners.

History
The community was named after the local Heater family.

Industry
Weyerhaeuser operates an oriented strand board (OSB) plant in Heaters.  On the Weyerhaeuser website, it is listed as the "Sutton OSB Mill.

Churches
The Heaters United Methodist Church is located at 3806 Gauley Turnpike, just south of the town of Heaters.  

There are six churches in the Heaters Charge.  The other five are: Tichenal, Berry Fork, Corley, Stone Run, and Mt. Harmony.

Cemeteries
There are several cemeteries located in and around Heaters.  Some are associated with churches, some are public, and some are private family cemeteries.  The cemeteries are: Bear Gardens Cemetery, Berry Chapel Cemetery, Dean Family Cemetery, Evans Cemetery, Heaters Cemetery, Highwood Cemetery, Little Kanawha Memorial Gardens, Marple Cemetery, Shields Cemetery, Squires Cemetery, Stutler Family Cemetery, and Tichenel Cemetery. There is also the Jake Singleton Cemetery located in Napier,West Virginia.

References

Unincorporated communities in Braxton County, West Virginia
Unincorporated communities in West Virginia